Events from the year 1720 in Great Britain.

Incumbents
 Monarch – George I
 Parliament – 5th

Events
 10 February – Edmond Halley is appointed Astronomer Royal by George I
 17 February – Treaty of The Hague signed between Britain, France, Austria, the Dutch Republic and Spain ending the War of the Quadruple Alliance.
 April – "South Sea Bubble": A scheme for the South Sea Company to take over most of Britain's unconsolidated government debt massively inflates share prices.
 15 April – Ralph Allen of Bath is appointed to farm Cross and Bye Posts (i.e. to manage mail not going via London), leading to his reform of the system.
 23 April (St George's Day) – George I publicly reconciles with his son George, Prince of Wales at St James's Palace  
 1 June – British silversmiths are once again allowed to use sterling silver after 24 years of being limited to a purer (but softer) Britannia silver.
 11 June
 Robert Walpole and his ally and brother-in-law Charles Townshend rejoin the government as Paymaster of the Forces and Lord President of the Council ending the Whig Split lasting since 1717. Within a year they will be Prime Minister and Northern Secretary respectively.
 Parliament approves the Bubble Act (formally the Royal Exchange and London Assurance Corporation Act 1719), prohibiting the formation of joint-stock companies except by royal charter.
 25 June – "South Sea Bubble" reaches its peak as South Sea Company stock is priced at £1,060 a share.
 12 July – Under authority of the Bubble Act, the Lords Justices attempt to curb some of the excesses of the stock markets during the "South Sea Bubble". They dissolve a number of petitions for patents and charters, and abolish more than 80 joint-stock companies of dubious merit, but this has little effect on the creation of "Bubbles", ephemeral joint-stock companies created during the hysteria of the times.
 September – "South Sea Bubble": share prices, led by those of the South Sea Company, collapse.
 16 November – English-born pirate captain "Calico Jack" Rackham (captured around October 31) is brought to trial at Spanish Town in Jamaica; he is hanged at Port Royal two days later. Most of his crew is also hanged but female pirates Mary Read and Anne Bonny (his Irish-born wife) are spared.
 29 December – Haymarket Theatre opens in London.

Births
 13 January – Richard Hurd, bishop and writer (died 1808)
 27 January (bapt.) – Samuel Foote, dramatist and actor (died 1777)
 9 March – Philip Yorke, 2nd Earl of Hardwicke, politician (died 1790)
 8 May - William Cavendish, 4th Duke of Devonshire, Prime Minister (died 1764)
 18 July – Gilbert White, naturalist and cleric (died 1793)
 18 August  – Laurence Shirley, 4th Earl Ferrers, murderer (died 1760)
 30 August – Samuel Whitbread, brewer and politician (died 1796)
 31 December – Charles Edward Stuart, pretender to the British throne (died 1788)

Deaths
 31 January – Thomas Grey, 2nd Earl of Stamford, privy councillor (born c. 1645)
 20 April – George Gordon, 1st Earl of Aberdeen, Lord Chancellor of Scotland (born 1637)
 5 August – Anne Finch, Countess of Winchilsea, English poet (born 1661)
 9 August – Simon Ockley, orientalist (born 1678)
 18 August – Matthew Aylmer, 1st Baron Aylmer, admiral (born c. 1650)
 18 November – Calico Jack, pirate (born c. 1682)

References

 
Years in Great Britain